Susan Badders (born September 16, 1951) is an American fencer. She competed in the women's team foil event at the 1984 Summer Olympics.

References

External links
 

1951 births
Living people
American female foil fencers
Olympic fencers of the United States
Fencers at the 1984 Summer Olympics
Sportspeople from Queens, New York
21st-century American women